Raphaël Dinelli is a French professional offshore sailor born on 13 May 1968 in Floirac, Gironde. He unofficially took part in the 1996-1997 Vendee Globe where he was rescued by Pete Goss after his boat sank in the Indian Ocean and he was in liferaft  dropped by an Australian Air Force plane. He went on to sail with Goss in the 1997 edition of the two person transatlantic race Transat Jacques Vabre where they won their class. He then went on to compete in the 2000, 2004 and 2008 edition of the Vendee Globe. In 2007, he founded the Ocean Vital Foundation, of which he is the director of research.

Gallery

References

External links
 Vital Ocean Foundation

1968 births
Living people
Sportspeople from Gironde
French male sailors (sport)
IMOCA 60 class sailors
French Vendee Globe sailors
2000 Vendee Globe sailors
2004 Vendee Globe sailors
2008 Vendee Globe sailors
Vendée Globe finishers
Single-handed circumnavigating sailors